The 1962 Los Angeles State Diablos football team represented Los Angeles State College—now known as California State University, Los Angeles—as a member of the California Collegiate Athletic Association (CCAA) during the 1962 NCAA College Division football season. Led by Leonard Adams in his 12th and final season as head coach, Los Angeles State compiled an overall record of 2–8 with a mark of 0–6 in conference play, placing last out of seven teams in the CCAA. The Diablos played home games at L.A. State Stadium in Los Angeles.

Adams finished tenure at Los Angeles State with an overall record of 41–61–6, for a .407 winning percentage.

Schedule

Team players in the NFL
The following Los Angeles State players were selected in the 1963 NFL Draft.

References

Los Angeles State
Cal State Los Angeles Diablos football seasons
Los Angeles State Diablos football